Séamus Pattison (19 April 1936 – 4 February 2018) was an Irish Labour Party politician who served as Leas-Cheann Comhairle of Dáil Éireann from 2002 to 2007, Ceann Comhairle of Dáil Éireann from 1997 to 2002, Minister of State for Social Welfare from 1983 to 1987 and Father of the Dáil from 1995 to 2007. He served as a Teachta Dála (TD) for the Carlow–Kilkenny constituency from 1961 to 2007. He was a Member of the European Parliament (MEP) for the Leinster constituency from 1981 to 1983.

Early life and education
Séamus Pattison was born in Kilkenny in 1936. His father was Labour Party TD James Pattison, who represented Carlow–Kilkenny from 1933 to 1957. After his education at University College Cork, Pattison became a full-time trade union official, serving with the Irish Transport and General Workers' Union (ITGWU).

Career
Pattison unsuccessfully contested the Carlow–Kilkenny by-election for Labour in June 1960, but was elected at the 1961 general election to the 17th Dáil, and held the seat at eleven further general elections.

He served as Mayor of Kilkenny on three occasions; 1967, 1976 and 1992. He became an MEP for Leinster in 1981, to replace Liam Kavanagh who became Minister for Labour following the 1981 general election. Pattison resigned as an MEP in 1983, following his appointment as Minister of State at the Department of Social Welfare, in which position he served until Labour left the government in January 1987.

He was unanimously elected Ceann Comhairle of Dáil Éireann on 26 June 1997, serving for the 28th Dáil. When the 29th Dáil assembled after the 2002 general election he was succeeded by Rory O'Hanlon, but was appointed as Leas-Cheann Comhairle (deputy chairperson) for the 29th Dáil.

Pattison was also a member of the Parliamentary Assembly of the Council of Europe.

In September 2005, he announced he would retire at the following general election, and his nephew Eoin Pattison unsuccessfully sought the nomination. Labour county councillor Michael O'Brien was selected in February 2006 to contest the seat, but was unsuccessful in the 2007 general election.

Later life and death
When Pattison retired from politics at the 2007 election he had served in Dáil Éireann for 45 years and 7 months, making him the fifth-longest serving TD ever, and the longest-ever-serving Labour Party TD. He was the longest-serving sitting TD from 1995 to 2007, and had the informal title of Father of the Dáil.

Pattison died from Parkinson's disease at his home in Kilkenny on 4 February 2018, aged 81.

See also
Families in the Oireachtas

References

External links

1936 births
2018 deaths
Labour Party (Ireland) MEPs
Labour Party (Ireland) TDs
Local councillors in County Kilkenny
Kilkenny
People from Kilkenny (city)
Members of the 17th Dáil
Members of the 18th Dáil
Members of the 19th Dáil
Members of the 20th Dáil
Members of the 21st Dáil
Members of the 22nd Dáil
Members of the 23rd Dáil
Members of the 24th Dáil
Members of the 25th Dáil
Members of the 26th Dáil
Members of the 27th Dáil
Members of the 28th Dáil
Members of the 29th Dáil
MEPs for the Republic of Ireland 1979–1984
Ministers of State of the 24th Dáil
Presiding officers of Dáil Éireann